CODEFF or Comité Nacional Pro Defensa de la Flora y Fauna is a Chilean non-governmental organization working on issues regarding the conservation, research and restoration of the environment. CODEFF has created a series of protected areas including Área Costera Protegida Punta Curiñanco.

References

External links

Environmental organisations based in Chile
Sustainability organizations